Physalospora is a genus of fungi in the family Hyponectriaceae. The genus is estimated to contain about 36 species that grow on dead leaves. Often confused with Botryosphaeria, Physalospora is probably polyphyletic.

Species
Physalospora abdita
Physalospora alpestris
Physalospora anamalaiensis
Physalospora aquatica
Physalospora arctostaphyli
Physalospora corni
Physalospora disrupta
Physalospora empetri
Physalospora ephedrae
Physalospora eucalypti
Physalospora euphorbiae
Physalospora lonicerae
Physalospora perseae
Physalospora prasiolae
Physalospora rhododendri
Physalospora scirpi
Physalospora vaccinii
Physalospora vitis-idaeae

References

Xylariales
Sordariomycetes genera